Le Châtelet-sur-Meuse (literally Le Châtelet on Meuse) is a commune in the Haute-Marne department in north-eastern France.

It contains the source of the River Meuse, which is very close the commune's village of Pouilly-en-Bassigny.

References

See also
Communes of the Haute-Marne department

Chateletsurmeuse